The Puzzle Place is an American children's television series produced by KCET in Los Angeles and Lancit Media in New York City. Although production was dated and premiered on two Los Angeles PBS stations, KCET and KLCS, on September 15, 1994, it did not officially premiere on all PBS stations nationwide until January 16, 1995, with its final episode airing on December 4, 1998, and reruns airing until March 31, 2000. It became one of PBS Kids' most popular series on the line-up since Sesame Street.

On April 3, 2000, Between the Lions replaced it on the schedule of many PBS stations.

Premise
The series follows a multi-ethnic group of children (puppets) from different parts of the United States who gather and socialize at  a special child hangout known as the Puzzle Place. In each episode, the characters are confronted with an everyday conflict usually encountered in childhood years, such as making moral decisions, sharing, racism and sexism.

Characters
 Julie Woo is a Chinese American girl from San Francisco, California. She is very sensitive and caring of her personal possessions and she sometimes tries a little too hard. She especially loves singing; though, outside of the show's musical numbers, her voice can be cacophonous to humorous effect. Performed by Alice Dinnean.
 Kiki Flores is a Mexican American girl from San Antonio, Texas. She is very outgoing and has a temper. She is also a great chili cook and has a Spanish-speaking cousin named Magdalena (“Hello Maggie”) who helps everyone to learn about acceptance. Performed by Carmen Osbahr.
 Ben Olafson is a Norwegian American boy from a farm near Renner, South Dakota. Like Jody, he is a child of a single parent, but unlike her, whose are divorced, his father is deceased (“Big Boys Don’t Cry”). He is good at solving difficult puzzles and a talented dancer. Though normally easygoing and friendly, he can be unforgiving when angered. Performed by Jim Martin.
 Leon MacNeal is an African American boy, possibly of West African origin, from New York City, New York (state). He wears dreadlocks, gets jealous easily, and sometimes does not think before he acts. He is a fan of hip-hop music and loves basketball. Performed by Noel MacNeal in seasons 1 and 2, with Eric Jacobson puppeteering him to MacNeal's voice in season 3.
 Skye Nakaiye is a Western Apache boy from the Fort Apache Indian Reservation in Arizona. He always wears a bandanna, a yellow coat, and a feather necklace. He is naturally curious and believes in staying true to his values and culture. Performed by Peter Linz in seasons 1 and 2, and Matt Vogel in season 3.
 Jody Silver is a Jewish Lithuanian American girl from Cincinnati, Ohio. Her parents are divorced, with her mother living in New York City (“Rip van Wrinkle”). She does not like to be called names, and she can be gullible but is usually enthusiastic. Performed by Alison Mork in season 1, Stephanie D'Abruzzo in season 2, and Terri Hardin in season 3.
 Kyle O'Connor is an Irish American boy and wheelchair user who appears in some episodes. Initially performed by Drew Massey, and later puppeteered by Allan Trautman to Hardin's voice.
 Weebus is the group's smart talking super-telecomputer that they use to communicate with people outside of the Puzzle Place. She is also capable of performing automated tasks and playing video clips to answer a question.
 Nuzzle and Sizzle are the pet dog and cat, respectively, at the Puzzle Place. They are seen mostly in the basement, talking to each other, and acting as animals around the kids. They are usually involved in a subplot. Sizzle was performed by Dinnean, and Nuzzle was performed by Linz in seasons 1 and 2 and Vogel in season 3.
 The Piece Police are multicolored inhabitants of the Puzzle Place. They communicate amongst themselves using gibberish, although they understand English. It is hinted in some episodes that they all know what Sizzle and Nuzzle are saying. Originally performed by Osbahr, Martin, MacNeal, and Mork, with D'Abruzzo replacing Mork in season 2, and Jacobson and Hardin replacing MacNeal and D'Abruzzo in season 3. D'Abruzzo also provided their singing voices.

Episodes

Pilot episodes
In early 1994, two pilot episodes were produced for the series known as The Puzzle Works. Eventually, the show was renamed The Puzzle Place shortly before its premiere months later.

Series overview

Season 1 (1995)

Season 2 (1996)

Season 3 (1998)

Broadcast
Besides the PBS stations in the United States, the series also aired on TV Cultura in Brazil, Discovery Kids in Latin America, RTP in Portugal, Kids Station in Japan, Israeli Educational Television in Israel, GMTV in the UK, and ABC Kids in Australia.

Home media
During its launch, Sony Wonder (and later KidVision) released The Puzzle Place on VHS. There are currently no plans to release it on DVD.

Tuned In (10. Spud Buds and 14. Cute is as Cute Does)
Rock Dreams (18. Mad Music Magic and 8. Rock Dreams)
Rip Van Wrinkle (17. Going by the Book and 3. Rip Van Wrinkle)
Accentuate the Positive (6. Rudy One and 4. Accentuate the Positive)
Deck The Halls
Sing-Along Songs

Reception
In the weeks after its debut, The Puzzle Place won a great deal of acclaim and "enjoyed an average audience-per-viewing second only to Barney and Friends among shows in the popular PBS daily children's block." It received a citation of excellence from UNIMA-USA for its use of puppetry. In 1997, ten more episodes of the show were "in the works". Toys "R" Us, Sears, and Payless ShoeSource all announced that they would carry merchandising from the series and showcase that merchandise in its own separate "boutique" rather than integrating it with the other products.

See also
Barney & Friends
Sesame Street
Dragon Tales
Between the Lions
Lamb Chop's Play-Along
The Magic School Bus
Kidsongs
Wishbone

References

External links
 

1995 American television series debuts
1998 American television series endings
1990s American children's television series
American children's musical television series
American preschool education television series
1990s preschool education television series
American television shows featuring puppetry
English-language television shows
Television series by Sony Pictures Television
PBS Kids shows
PBS original programming
Television series about children